Łany Wielkie  is a village in the administrative district of Gmina Sośnicowice, within Gliwice County, Silesian Voivodeship, in southern Poland.

The village has a population of 748.

References

Villages in Gliwice County